Austroicetes vulgaris (Southeastern Austroicetes) is a grasshopper in the genus Austroicetes. It is sometimes a pest in Tasmania, and can also be found in Northern Territory, Australia.

References 

Oedipodinae
Insects described in 1932
Taxa named by Bror Yngve Sjöstedt